Wauneta is an unincorporated community in Chautauqua County, Kansas, United States.

History
Wauneta once had a post office; it closed in 1961. Wauneta once also had a grocery store, gas station and auto repair shop.

References

Further reading

External links
 Chautauqua County maps: Current, Historic, KDOT

Unincorporated communities in Chautauqua County, Kansas
Unincorporated communities in Kansas